Bennett Hill is an American racecar driver.

Bennett Hill may also refer to:

 Bennett D. Hill (1934–2005), American historian

Places
 Bennett Hill (lunar mountain), mountain on Earth's moon
 Bennett Hill Farm, in New York